Dimethoxy-4-amylamphetamine (DOAM) is a lesser-known psychedelic drug and a substituted amphetamine. DOAM was first synthesized by Alexander Shulgin. In his book PiHKAL (Phenethylamines i Have Known And Loved), the minimum dosage is listed as 10 mg, and the duration is unknown. DOAM produces a bare threshold and tenseness. As the 4-alkyl chain length is increased from shorter homologues such as DOM, DOET and DOPR which are all potent hallucinogens, the 5-HT2 binding affinity increases, rising to a maximum with the 4-(n-hexyl) derivative before falling again with even longer chains, but compounds with chain length longer than n-propyl, or with other bulky groups such as isopropyl, t-butyl or γ-phenylpropyl at the 4- position, fail to substitute for hallucinogens in animals or produce hallucinogenic effects in humans, suggesting these have low efficacy and are thus antagonists or partial agonists at the 5-HT2A receptor.

See also 
 2,5-Dimethoxy-4-Substituted Amphetamines

References

External links 
 DOAM Entry in PiHKAL
 DOAM Entry in PiHKAL • info

Substituted amphetamines
2,5-Dimethoxyphenethylamines